Encrasicholina is a genus of ray-finned fish in the family Engraulidae.

Species
There are currently 8 recognized species in this genus:
 Encrasicholina gloria Hata & Motomura, 2016 (Red Sea anchovy) 
 Encrasicholina heteroloba (Rüppell, 1837) (Devis' anchovy) 
 Encrasicholina intermedia Hata & Motomura, 2016 (Shiner anchovy) 
 Encrasicholina macrocephala Hata & Motomura, 2015  (Largehead anchovy)
 Encrasicholina oligobranchus (Wongratana, 1983) (Philippine anchovy)
 Encrasicholina pseudoheteroloba (Hardenberg, 1933) (Short-head anchovy) 
 Encrasicholina punctifer Fowler, 1938 (Buccaneer anchovy)
 Encrasicholina purpurea (Fowler, 1900) (Hawaiian anchovy)

References

 
Marine fish genera
Taxa named by Henry Weed Fowler